was a Japanese samurai of the Azuchi-Momoyama period who served the Toyotomi clan.  He was executed in 1600 for stealing  a valuable tea bowl from the late Toyotomi Hideyoshi's storehouse.

Samurai
1600 deaths
1541 births